Radyo Bandera 95.7 Sweet FM (DYBZ-FM 95.7 MHz) is an FM station owned and operated by Xanthone Plus Broadcasting Services. Its studios and transmitter are located at San Jose de Buenavista, Antique.

References

External links
Sweet FM Antique FB Page

Radio stations in Antique (province)
Radio stations established in 2015